Duan Jin (born December 1960) is a Chinese planner and professor at Southeast University.

Education
Duan was born in Nanjing, Jiangsu in December 1960. He received his master's degree and doctor's degree from Tianjin University in 1982 and 1985, respectively. He earned his doctor's degree from Southeast University under the direction of Qi Kang.

Career
From September 1990 to January 1992 he was a visiting scholar at Catholic University of Leuven. He joined the faculty of Southeast University in April 2003, what he was promoted to deputy dean of its School of Architecture in November 2003 and to director of its Institute of Urban Space in September 2005.

Honours and awards
 2016 Title of "National Great Engineering Survey Design Master" by the Ministry of Housing and Urban-Rural Development
 November 22, 2019 Member of the Chinese Academy of Sciences (CAS)

References

1960 births
Living people
Educators from Nanjing
Tianjin University alumni
Academic staff of Southeast University
Members of the Chinese Academy of Sciences